Dmytro Anatoliovych Pryma (born 13 March 1985) is a Ukrainian football striker currently playing for Ukrainian Second League club Stal Dniprodzerzhynsk.

Club history
Dmytro Pryma began his football career in Dynamo Youth in Kiev.

References

External links
  Profile – Official Stal site
  FC Stal Dniprodzerzhynsk Squad on the PFL website
  Profile on the FFU website

1985 births
Living people
FC Kremin Kremenchuk players
Ukrainian footballers
Association football forwards
Footballers from Kyiv